Jesse van Ruller (born 21 January 1972) is a Dutch jazz guitarist and composer. He won the Thelonious Monk International Jazz Guitar Competition in 1995 and has recorded several albums as a leader and more as a sideman.

Early life
Van Ruller was born in Amsterdam on 21 January 1972. He started playing the guitar at the age of seven. "He continued his studies at Miami University, Ohio (MM 1995), and in 1995 won the Thelonious Monk International Jazz Guitar Competition in Washington, DC."

Later life and career
Van Ruller recorded two quintet albums for Bluemusic: European Quintet in 1996 and Herbs, Fruits, Balms and Spices two years later. He went on to record three albums for Criss Cross Jazz. These were Here and There and Circles in 2002, and Views in 2005. The guitarist composed almost all of the pieces played on the last two.

Discography

As leader

As sideman

References

Bibliography

1972 births
Dutch jazz guitarists
Living people
21st-century guitarists
Criss Cross Jazz artists